Abacion tesselatum is a species of crested millipede in the family Abacionidae. It is found in North America.

References

Further reading

 

Callipodida
Millipedes of North America
Articles created by Qbugbot
Animals described in 1820